Agonopterix deltopa is a moth in the family Depressariidae. It was described by Edward Meyrick and Aristide Caradja in 1935. It is found in China and Japan.

References

Moths described in 1935
Agonopterix
Moths of Asia
Moths of Japan